Catharina "Toos" van der Ende (later van Akkeren, born 1945/46) is a retired Dutch rower. Together with Truus Bauer she won two European silver medals in the double sculls.

References

1940s births
Living people
Dutch female rowers
Sportspeople from Delft
European Rowing Championships medalists
20th-century Dutch women